The Boston & Northern Street Railway Company (B&N) was a horse-drawn and electric streetcar railroad operated on the streets of Boston, Massachusetts, and communities to the north. Founded in 1859 as the Lynn and Boston Railroad (L&B), via lease and merger it became a primary mass transit provider for northeastern Massachusetts and New Hampshire. Its immediate successor was the Bay State Street Railway (Bay State), and its modern successor is the state-run Massachusetts Bay Transportation Authority (MBTA).

Formation
The Boston & Northern was renamed from the Lynn & Boston on July 23, 1901, following the latter's purchase and merger of the following companies, each having previously acquired the below-listed smaller street railways. Additional street railway companies were subsequently acquired.

All of the following street railway companies eventually became part of the Bay State, which was later absorbed by the Eastern Massachusetts Street Railway (Eastern Mass) in 1919.  Eastern Mass was acquired by the Massachusetts Bay Transportation Authority (MBTA) in 1968.

Constituent companies

Lynn & Boston Railroad Company
The L&B was formed on April 6, 1859 and later merged in 1901 into the B&N.
 Beverly & Danvers Street Railwayincorporated 1896, merged 1901 into the L&B.
 Boston & Chelsea Railroadincorporated 1854, leased 1880 to L&B.
 Boston & Revere Electric Street Railwayincorporated 1889, leased 1895 to the L&B.
 East Middlesex Street Railwayincorporated 1887, leased 1893 to the L&B.
 Essex Electric Street Railwaysold 1894 to the L&B.
 Gloucester Street Railwayincorporated 1886, sold 1900 to the L&B.
 Gloucester Essex & Beverly Street Railwayincorporated 1893, sold 1900 to Gloucester Street Railway.
 Gloucester & Rockport Street Railwayincorporated in 1894, leased in 1895 to Gloucester Street Railway, merged 1901 into L&B.
 Rockport Street Railwayincorporated 1896, sold 1900 to Gloucester Street Railway.
 Lynn Belt Line Street Railwayincorporated 1889, sold 1894 to L&B.
 Naumkeag Street Railwayincorporated 1875, sold 1894 to L&B.
 Salem Street Railwayincorporated 1861 as the Salem and South Danvers Railroad Co., consolidated into Naumkeag Street Railway in 1886.
 Salem & Danvers Street Railwayincorporated 1884, leased 1887 to Naumkeag Street Railway.
 North Woburn Street Railway Companyincorporated 1866, merged 1901 into B&N.
 Wakefield & Stoneham Street Railwayincorporated 1892, sold 1900 to L&B.
 Mystic Valley Street Railway Co.incorporated 1896, sold 1899 to Wakefield & Stoneham Street Railway.
 Arlington & Winchester Street Railwayincorporated 1897, sold 1898 to Mystic Valley Street Railway Co.
 Reading & Lowell Street Railwayincorporated 1895, sold 1899 to Wakefield & Stoneham Street Railway.
 Salem & Wakefield Street Railwayincorporated 1897, sold 1899 to Wakefield & Stoneham Street Railway.
 Woburn & Reading Street Railwayincorporated 1896, sold 1899 to Wakefield & Stoneham Street Railway.
 Winnisimmet Street Railwayincorporated 1857, leased to L&B.

Lowell, Lawrence & Haverhill Street Railway Company
The Lowell, Lawrence & Haverhill Street Railway Company (LL&H) was incorporated 1892, later merged in 1901 into the B&N.
 Haverhill & Groveland Street Railwayincorporated 1877, merged 1893 into LL&H.
 Merrimack Valley Street Railwaymerged 1893 into LL&H.
 Lowell & Suburban Street Railwayincorporated 1859, sold 1900 to LL&H.
 Lowell Horse Railroad Company incorporated 1863, merged 1891 into Lowell & Suburban Street Railway.
 Lowell & Dracut Street Railwaypurchased in 1890 by Lowell Horse Railroad Company.
 Peoples Street Railwayincorporated 1897, sold 1898 to LL&H.

Subsequently acquired companies
 Georgetown Rowley & Ipswich Street Railway - incorporated 1899, sold 1906 to B&N.
 Haverhill Georgetown & Danvers Street Railway - incorporated 1893, sold 1906 to B&N.
 Lawrence & Reading Street Railway - incorporated 1900, sold 1903 to B&N.
 Reading Wakefield & Lynnfield Street Railway - incorporated 1902, sold 1903 to Lawrence & Reading Street Railway.
 Lowell & Woburn Street Railway Co. - incorporated 1905, sold 1906 to B&N.
 Middleton & Danvers Street Railway - incorporated 1901, sold 1903 to B&N.

Communities served
The following cities and towns in Massachusetts and New Hampshire were served by the B&N:

 Andover
 Arlington
 Beverly
 Billerica
 Boston
 Chelmsford
 Chelsea
 Danvers
 Dracut
 Essex
 Everett
 Gloucester
 Groveland
 Hamilton
 Haverhill
 Hudson
 Ipswich
 Lawrence
 Lowell
 Lynn
 Lynnfield
 Malden
 Marblehead
 Medford
 Melrose
 Methuen
 Nashua
 Newburyport
 North Andover
 Peabody
 Reading
 Revere
 Rockport
 Salem
 Saugus
 Stoneham
 Swampscott
 Tewksbury
 Tyngsborough
 Wakefield
 Wenham
 West Newbury
 Wilmington
 Winchester
 Woburn

References 

Streetcars in the Boston area
Interurban railways in Massachusetts
Defunct Massachusetts railroads
Public transportation in the Boston area
Tram, urban railway and trolley companies
Defunct companies based in Massachusetts
1859 establishments in Massachusetts
Railway companies disestablished in 1911
Railway companies established in 1859
Transportation in Essex County, Massachusetts
American companies established in 1859
Rail transportation in Boston